Eliyahu Sasson  (2 February 1902 – 8 October 1978) was an Israeli politician and minister.

Biography
Eliyahu Sasson was born in Damascus in Ottoman Syria. He studied at an Alliance School in his hometown and the Université Saint-Joseph in Beirut. He became a member of the Arab National Movement, and edited a Jewish-Arab newspaper named al-Hayat. He immigrated to Palestine in 1927 and worked as an electrician, journalist and lecturer on Middle East affairs.

Diplomatic career
He began working in the political department of the Jewish Agency for Israel, serving as head of the Arab department between 1933 and 1948. A member of the Jewish delegation to the United Nations between 1947 and 1948 and at the ceasefire negotiations in 1949, he worked as director of the Middle East department of the Foreign Affairs Ministry between 1948 and 1950, before heading an office in Paris for contacts with Arab nations. He is reported by Benny Morris to have been a member in 1948 of one of the government's unofficial Transfer Committees, set up to facilitate the removal of Arabs from their towns and villages. He also served as the Israeli envoy to Turkey (1950–1952), an envoy and ambassador to Italy (1953–1960) and ambassador to Switzerland (1960–1961).

Political career
In 1961, he returned to Israel and was appointed Minister of Postal Services by David Ben-Gurion. He was elected to the Knesset in the 1965 elections, and retained his cabinet post until 2 January 1967, when he became Minister of Police. Although he was re-elected in 1969, he lost his ministerial post upon the formation of the new government. He lost his seat in the 1973 elections.

References

External links

1902 births
1978 deaths
Alignment (Israel) politicians
Ambassadors of Israel to Italy
Ambassadors of Israel to Switzerland
Jews in the French Mandate for Syria and the Lebanon
Members of the 6th Knesset (1965–1969)
Members of the 7th Knesset (1969–1974)
Ministers of Communications of Israel
Ministers of Public Security of Israel
People from Damascus
People of the Jewish Agency for Israel
Sephardi Jews in Ottoman Palestine
Sephardi Jews in Ottoman Syria
Syrian Jews